Francis Harrison Pierpont is a 1910 marble sculpture of Francis Harrison Pierpont by Franklin Simmons installed in the United States Capitol, in Washington, D.C., as part of the National Statuary Hall Collection. It is one of two statues donated by the state of West Virginia. The sculpture was unveiled by the Hon. Thomas Condit Miller, on April 27, 1937.
 
The statue is one of three that Simmons has placed in the collection, the others being William King, from Maine  and Roger Williams from Rhode Island.

See also

 1910 in art

References

External links
 

1910 establishments in Washington, D.C.
1910 sculptures
Marble sculptures in Washington, D.C.
Monuments and memorials in Washington, D.C.
Pierpont, Francis Harrison
Sculptures of men in Washington, D.C.